The discography of Roscoe Dash, an American rapper, consists of one extended play, six mixtapes, two music videos, and eight singles, (including ten as a featured artist).

Dash's first mixtape, Can't Catch the Lambo with DJ Kutt Throat, was released on March 22, 2010, preceded his first single, "All the Way Turnt Up" featuring rapper and record producer Soulja Boy. "All the Way Turnt Up" peaked inside the top fifty of the Billboard Hot 100, and also charted inside the top twenty of the Hot R&B/Hip-Hop Songs, and Hot Rap Songs charts. "Show Out" was released as a single as well. The debut EP, J.U.I.C.E. was released on December 20, 2011, which has been preceded by the lone single "Good Good Night". It charted at number ninety-one on the Billboard Hot 100.

In addition to his own work, Dash has appeared in several other artist's recordings, the most commercially successful of these being "No Hands" by Waka Flocka Flame, along with rapper Wale, which peaked at number 13 on the Billboard Hot 100.

Albums

Compilation albums

Miscellaneous

Mixtapes

Extended plays

Singles

As lead artist

As featured artist

Guest appearances

Music videos

As lead artist

Notes

References

Hip hop discographies
Discographies of American artists